Line B is a line on the Lyon Metro that runs between Charpennes and Gare d'Oullins. It was constructed using the cut-and-cover method, and went into service on 2 May 1978. Together with Line A, it was one of the inaugural lines of the Lyon Metro. It has since been extended three times: from Part-Dieu to Jean Macé in 1981, from Jean Macé to Stade de Gerland in 2000, and from Stade de Gerland to Oullins railway station in 2013. Line B trains run on tires rather than steel wheels; it is a rubber-tired metro line.

List of the stations

 Charpennes - Charles Hernu (transfers: metro A, trams T1, T4)
 Brotteaux
 Part-Dieu - Vivier Merle (transfers: SNCF, trams T1, T3, T4, Rhônexpress)
 Place Guichard - Bourse du Travail
 Saxe-Gambetta (transfer: metro D)
 Jean Macé (transfers: SNCF, tram T2)
 Place Jean-Jaurès
 Debourg (transfer: tram T1)
 Stade de Gerland
 Oullins (transfer: SNCF)

Chronology
 2 May 1978: Charpennes - Part-Dieu
 14 September 1981: Part-Dieu - Jean Macé
 4 September 2000: Jean Macé - Stade de Gerland
 11 December 2013: Stade de Gerland - Gare d'Oullins

Future
Line B was extended a few kilometres southbound from Stade de Gerland to Oullins railway station. A tunnel had to be built under the Rhône River. This extension opened on 11 December 2013 at 2pm (11/12/13, 14:00).

By 2023, Line B will be extended from Gare d'Oullins to Hôpital Lyon Sud (South Lyon Hospital). This extension will be long of 2.5 kilometres and will create two new stations: The first is "Oullins Centre" (city center of Oullins) and the second is "Hôpital Lyon Sud" (South Lyon Hospital).

Since June 2022, line B runs with a new driverless system, and new MPL 16 trains circulate on it. This new rolling stock has been ordered to Alstom in 2016. The current MPL 75 trains will join the others MPL 75 of line A to increase the capacity.

References

External links
Transports en Commun Lyonnais (TCL)
Extension to Oullins

3rd arrondissement of Lyon
Rubber-tyred metros
Railway lines opened in 1978
B